Nathalie Herreman (born 28 March 1966) is a former professional tennis player. 

She played on the WTA Tour from 1983 to 1995 and won a singles title in 1986 in Perugia and reached the fourth round at Wimbledon in 1990.

WTA career finals

Singles 1 (1–0)

Doubles 5 (2–3)

ITF finals

Singles (1–3)

Doubles (4–0)

References

External links
 
 

French female tennis players
1966 births
Living people
Place of birth missing (living people)
People from Sainte-Adresse
Sportspeople from Seine-Maritime